Amalga is a former gold-mining town outside of Juneau, Alaska. The area is now part of the Tongass National Forest. The Library of Congress has a photograph of Amalga by Winter & Pond in its collection. The area was once homesteaded and farmed. A horse tram brought goods delivered by steamship to the mine.

Amalga had a post office near the Eagle River Mine. Amalga was established in 1902 and abandoned by 1927.

References

1902 establishments in Alaska
1927 disestablishments in Alaska
Former populated places in Alaska
Populated places established in 1902
Populated places disestablished in 1927
Tongass National Forest